200 Cartas (released worldwide as Looking for María Sánchez) is an independent Puerto Rican film, written and directed by Bruno Irizarry, starring Lin-Manuel Miranda, Jaime Camil, Dayanara Torres, Monica Steuer and Mayra Matos Pérez.

Synopsis
Struggling nuyorican comic book artist Raúl (Lin-Manuel Miranda) meets a woman named María Sánchez (Mayra Matos Pérez), who's visiting from Puerto Rico, at a bar in New York City and immediately falls in love with her. After the two part their ways and María returns to Puerto Rico, Raúl seeks his friend and coworker Juan (Jaime Camil) to help him find her. They both travel to Puerto Rico to search for María Sánchez, only to find that there are two hundred women with that same name in the phone book. During their search, Yolanda (Dayanara Torres) meets Raúl and Juan and offers to help them find Raúl's love of his life. Raúl then comes up with writing 200 letters addressed to each María Sánchez found in the phone book and personally contacting or meeting the ones who respond, in hopes to find the one he met in New York City.

Cast
Lin-Manuel Miranda as Raúl
Jaime Camil as Juan
Dayanara Torres as Yolanda
Monica Steuer as Rebeca
Mayra Matos Pérez as María Sánchez
Víctor Alicea as the husband
Jonathan Louis Ramos as Tito
Marisé Alvarez as Sara
Neville Archambault as Scary Man
Iris Chacón as the Santera
Bruno Irizarry as Marcos
Juan Manuel Lebrón as Don Armando
Luis Raúl as Pedro

Production
Filmed over 17 days in New York and Puerto Rico, the movie grossed an estimated $1 million after its release in June 2013 in New York City, its World Premieres Film Festival showing in the Philippines in July 2013 and its premiere in Puerto Rico in September 2013.

References

2013 films
Films set in Puerto Rico
Films shot in Puerto Rico